Rubén Rodríguez Durán (born 29 September 1983 in Vigo, Pontevedra, Galicia) is a Spanish professional footballer who plays for UD Ourense as a forward.

External links
 
 
 

1983 births
Living people
Spanish footballers
Footballers from Vigo
Association football forwards
Segunda División players
Segunda División B players
CD Ourense footballers
Zamora CF footballers
CD Lugo players
Real Unión footballers
UD Logroñés players
Racing de Santander players